The Canadian Anti-terrorism Act (the Act) was passed by the Parliament of Canada in response to the September 11, 2001, attacks in the United States. It received Royal Assent on December 18, 2001, as Bill C-36. The "omnibus bill" extended the powers of government and institutions within the Canadian security establishment to respond to the threat of terrorism.

The expanded powers were highly controversial due to widely perceived incompatibility with the Canadian Charter of Rights and Freedoms, in particular for the Act's provisions allowing for 'secret' trials, preemptive detention and expansive security and surveillance powers.

Civic opposition
The Act'''s passage has been compared to the government's activation of the War Measures Act in accordance to terrorist activity by the FLQ.

It was opposed by Parliamentarians Marjory LeBreton and Andrew Telegdi, and criminal defense lawyer David Paciocco, amongst others. Ziyad Mia, of the Toronto Muslim Lawyers Association, "questioned whether the definition of terrorist activity would apply to a group that resisted, by acts of violence, the regimes of Saddam Hussein or Robert Mugabe," and pointed out that it criminalized the French Resistance and Nelson Mandela.

Prosecutions
In January 2010, Zakaria Amara, from Mississauga, a suspect in the 2006 Toronto terrorism case, was sentenced to imprisonment for life. This sentence was the stiffest given so far under the Act. Saad Gaya from Oakville, a fellow suspect in the same case, was sentenced to 12 years in prison.

Combating Terrorism Act (2013)
Some of the bill's provisions were set to expire on March 1, 2007. The Harper government urged that these be renewed, while all three opposition parties were opposed. Specifically, the provisions had to do with preventative arrest and investigative hearings.  On February 28, 2007, the House of Commons voted 159–124 against renewing the provisions, which later led to their expiry, as originally planned in the sunset clause.

In 2012, the Government of Canada introduced in the Senate of Canada Bill S-7, the Combating Terrorism Act, which was to renew the expired provisions for a new five-year term, and introduced new crimes for leaving Canada to join or train with a terror group. The bill also increased the maximum prison sentences for some offences related to harbouring suspected terrorists. On April 19, just after the Boston Marathon bombing, the government rearranged the Parliamentary agenda to fast-track Bill S-7 to a vote on April 22 or 23, 2013. The Act received royal assent on April 25, 2013.

See also
 Anti-terrorism Act, 2015''
Anti-terrorism legislation
PROFUNC

References

External links
Designated terrorist groups
Air India families urge Dion to rethink Liberal stance on anti-terrorism act

2001 in Canadian law
Canadian federal legislation
Terrorism laws in Canada
Omnibus legislation